The following lists events that happened during 1965 in Laos.

Incumbents
Monarch: Savang Vatthana 
Prime Minister: Souvanna Phouma

Events

July
18 July - 1965 Laotian parliamentary election

November
November - The Wapi Project begins.

References

 
1960s in Laos
Years of the 20th century in Laos
Laos
Laos